Kroizer is a surname. Notable people with the surname include:

Yehuda Kroizer (born 1955), Israeli rabbi
Zundel Kroizer (1924–2014), Israeli rabbi